Spyridium villosum is a species of flowering plant in the family Rhamnaceae and is endemic to the south-west of Western Australia. It is a small shrub with shaggy-hairy branchlets, linear to oblong leaves and dense heads of hairy flowers with broad brown bracts at the base.

Description
The flowers heads are densely crowded in cymes with broad, brown bracts at the base and one or two floral leaves.

Taxonomy
This species was first formally described in 1858 by Nikolai Turczaninow who gave it the name Cryptandra villosa in the Bulletin de la Société Impériale des Naturalistes de Moscou. In 1863, George Bentham changed the name to Spyridium villosum in Flora Australiensis. The specific epithet (villosum) means "with long, soft hairs".

Distribution and habitat
Spyridium villosum grows in sand over sandstone, in the eastern part of the Stirling Range, with one collection from near Ongerup.

Conservation status
Spyridium spadiceum is listed as "Priority Two" by the Western Australian Government Department of Biodiversity, Conservation and Attractions, meaning that it is poorly known and from only one or a few locations.

References

villosum
Rosales of Australia
Flora of Western Australia
Plants described in 1858
Taxa named by Nikolai Turczaninow